Puzzle Quest: The Legend Returns is a Match 3 and role-playing video game hybrid developed by Infinity Plus 2 and published by D3 Go!. It is part of the Puzzle Quest series, and was released for Nintendo Switch on September 19, 2019. An enhanced remaster of Puzzle Quest: Challenge of the Warlords, it contains the original game, the expansion Revenge of the Plague Lord, and new quests, spells, classes and items that are exclusive to the version. The game received positive reviews from critics, who cited its gameplay and value, although they criticized its visuals and difficulty spikes.

Gameplay 

Similar to the original title, the game involves battles versus enemies using a Match 3 format. The player chooses one of many RPG classes, some of which were added in the remaster. The player and their AI opponent take turns moving pieces on the shared game board in order to match one or more colored tiles. Special attacks can also be used by consuming mana in the form of pieces. The player also earns gold and experience points, similar to a traditional RPG.

Direct damage can be dealt to the enemy in the form of skills, as well as skull items. Depending on the class, the player can have a different experience in battle, with each class having a unique ability.

Development 
Compared to the original title, The Legend Returns adds new content, classes and companions.

Reception 
Puzzle Quest: The Legend Returns received an aggregate score of 78/100 on Metacritic.

Neal Ronaghan of Nintendo World Report rated the game 8/10 points, stating that while the game "shows its age in its presentation, the combat still soars". He noted that, in the 12 years since the original game's release, "similar genre-blending games have cropped up, but in a way, nothing has really matched or surpassed the complexity of Puzzle Quest". Praising the game's "good variety of brand new content, most notably found in five new classes", he stated that "the class variety is awesome", but offered criticism of the mechanic, claiming that "the depth and length of the game makes running multiple characters not all that fun".

He criticized the game's story, stating that "the mostly generic fantasy plot and lore never grabbed me", despite the remaster's newfound emphasis on background details. Calling the visual presentation "basic", he stated that it did not make the world more endearing. While saying that the game was "deep and memorable", he nevertheless criticized it as dated, saying that most of its aspects felt like "something straight out of 2007", and singling out the "bland visuals and presentation".

Anna Marie Privitere of RPGamer rated the game 3.5/5 points, saying that "the Switch version of Puzzle Quest is the best the game has ever looked". She stated that the game was "the definitive way to play the first adventure, despite the slowdowns and occasional crash".

Jeff Ramos of Polygon called the game "a match-three time capsule", saying that it "makes so few changes to the original design, it bypasses much of what is the 'norm' for similar, modern titles". He praised the game's lack of "microtransactions, timers, or other attention-grabbing pings", saying that in comparison to other mobile games, it "can feel remarkably quiet and peaceful".

References 

Puzzle Quest
2019 video games
D3 Publisher games
Video game remasters
Nintendo Switch games
Nintendo Switch-only games
Video games developed in Australia